Carlo Murena (Rome, 1713–1764) was an Italian architect of the late-Baroque period active in Rome, Foligno, Perugia, and other towns in central Italy. He was a pupil of Niccolo Salvi, but was sent to train with Luigi Vanvitelli, who was then building the Lazzaretto of Ancona.

Works
Murena completed a church of Monte Morcino at Perugia for the Olivetan monks. He designed the tabernacle for the Cathedral of Terni. At Foligno, he designed the church of the Holy Trinity. In Rome, Murena constructed the Zampai chapel and its funereal monuments, all found in Sant'Antonio dei Portoghesi. His work has been the subject of or discussed in many books on Baroque architecture in Italy.

References

1713 births
1764 deaths
18th-century Italian architects
18th-century Italian mathematicians